Wendy Frances Fatin (born 10 April 1941) is a retired Australian politician. She was a member of the Australian Labor Party (ALP) and was the first woman from Western Australia elected to the House of Representatives, representing the division of Canning (1983–1984) and Brand (1984–96). She held ministerial office in the Hawke and Keating Governments, serving as Minister for Local Government (1990–1991), Minister assisting the Prime Minister for the Status of Women (1990–1993), and Minister for the Arts and Territories (1991–1993).

Early life
Fatin became a registered nurse in 1962 and later attained a Bachelor of Applied Science (Nursing) from the Western Australian Institute of Technology (WAIT). She was a strong advocate for women's issues and was one of the founders of the Women's Electoral Lobby in Western Australia. She served as a ministerial adviser to the Minister for Repatriation and Compensation and Minister for Social Security in 1974–1975.

Politics
At the 1983 election, Fatin was elected to the House of Representatives for the Division of Canning, winning the seat from the Liberals' Mel Bungey on a 9.1% swing. She is notable as being the first Western Australian woman to win a seat in that House. Following an electoral redistribution, she won the new seat of Brand at the 1984 election, holding it until her retirement in 1996.

In April 1990, Fatin was appointed to the Hawke ministry as Minister for Local Government and Minister assisting the Prime Minister for the Status of Women. In December 1991, she left Local Government and was appointed Minister for the Arts and Territories, retaining her Status of Women role. She stepped down from the ministry after the 1993 election, and chose to retire from politics at the 1996 election, being succeeded in her seat by deputy prime minister Kim Beazley, who had moved from the marginal seat of Swan.

Later life
Her advocacy work continued beyond her retirement from politics, and she is an honorary life member of the Australian Reproductive Health Alliance.

References

External links
 Person notes at National Archives of Australia

1941 births
Living people
Australian Labor Party members of the Parliament of Australia
Members of the Cabinet of Australia
Members of the Australian House of Representatives for Canning
Members of the Australian House of Representatives for Brand
Members of the Australian House of Representatives
Women members of the Australian House of Representatives
People from Harvey, Western Australia
20th-century Australian politicians
Women government ministers of Australia
Australian women nurses
Australian nurses
Curtin University alumni
20th-century Australian women politicians